A list of films produced in Italy in 1990 (see 1990 in film):

See also
1990 in Italian television

References

External links
Italian films of 1990 at the Internet Movie Database

1990
Lists of 1990 films by country or language
Films